Andrew Porter (born 16 January 1996) is an Irish rugby union player for Leinster and Ireland. He plays as a prop and is able to cover both loosehead and tighthead.

Early life
Porter was educated and played rugby at St. Andrew's College, Dublin from 2008–2014.
He then attended and played rugby for University College Dublin.

Professional career

Leinster
Porter entered the Leinster academy in Summer 2016 and made his senior first team debut off the bench against Benetton Treviso in the first game of the season on 2 September.

International

At under-20 level, Porter starred for the Ireland U20 team for two seasons, including being involved in their best ever result in the Junior World Championship in 2016, when they finished runners-up. He made twelve appearances and scored two tries over the two seasons of his involvement with the squad.

Porter first represented Ireland at senior level in 2017.

Lions
On 6 May 2021, Porter was named in the squad for the 2021 British & Irish Lions tour to South Africa.

International tries 
As of 11 February 2023

Playing attributes
Porter is noted for his strength and power. He could squat 350 kg (772 lb), making him already one of the strongest rugby players in the world, when he was aged just 20 and in his first year under professional contract.

He is also noted for his surprising speed and mobility in the loose, as evidenced by his making a break and scoring a try from inside his own half in the 2015–16 season for UCD in the AIL League.

Honours

Ireland
Six Nations Championship:
Winner (2): 2018,	2023
Grand Slam:
Winner (2): 2018, 2023
Triple Crown:
Winner (3): 2018, 2022, 2023

Leinster
European Rugby Champions Cup (1): 2017–18
Pro14 (4): 2017–18, 2018–19, 2019–20, 2020–21

References

External links

Leinster Profile
Ireland Profile
Pro14 Profile

1996 births
Living people
Irish rugby union players
Rugby union players from Dublin (city)
Rugby union props
Leinster Rugby players
Ireland international rugby union players
People educated at St Andrew's College, Dublin
Alumni of University College Dublin
British & Irish Lions rugby union players from Ireland